Central Province was one of the seven provinces of the Maldives. The provinces were created in a decentralization attempt by the Nasheed administration in 2008. It was governed by the Minister of State for Home Affairs, Ms. Thilmeeza Hussain. Rejecting this change, the Parliament saw the abolition of the province system in 2010, through a newly enacted Decentralization Act. It consisted of Dhaalu, Faafu and Meemu Atolls. Its capital was Kudahuvadhoo. Its population (2006 census) was 13,442.

References

Provinces of the Maldives